Canadian Slavonic Papers / Revue canadienne des slavistes is a quarterly peer-reviewed academic journal covering Central and Eastern European studies. It is the official journal of the Canadian Association of Slavists and published on its behalf by Taylor & Francis. The editor-in-chief is James Krapfl (McGill University). Articles are in English or French.

Abstracting and indexing
The journal is abstracted and indexed in:
EBSCO databases
Emerging Sources Citation Index
FRANCIS
International Bibliography of the Social Sciences
Linguistic Bibliography/Bibliographie Linguistique
MLA International Bibliography
ProQuest databases
Scopus

References

External links

Taylor & Francis academic journals
Slavic studies journals
Quarterly journals
Publications established in 1956
Multilingual journals
Ethnic studies in Canada